Lalitha Lenin (born 17 July 1946, in Thrithalloor, Thrissur, Kerala) is an Indian poet in Malayalam.

K. K. Lalitha Bai (her official name) was also the Head of the Department of Library and Information Science, University of Kerala, Thiruvananthapuram. In addition, she was a member in the Senate and Academic Council of the University of Kerala, General Council of Kerala Sahitya Academy, Jansikshan Sansthan Management Board, Governing Body of the State Institute of Children's Literature, State Resource Centre, Kerala State Core Group on Continuing Education. She was also a member of the Governing Body of the  State Institute of Languages.

Personal life
Lalitha Lenin was born in 1946 at Thrithalloor, Thrissur, Kerala. She is married to Mr. K. M. Lenin who is also a writer and columnist dealing with international affairs. Her son, Anil Lale and her daughter-in-law Bidushi Lale are both lawyers and are working in Mumbai.

Background
She graduated from the University of Kerala with degrees in Chemistry, Education and Library Science.

She was awarded the Dr. S.R. Ranganathan Gold Medal for securing first Rank in Master of Library Science Degree Examination from the University of Mysore in 1976. She joined as Assistant Librarian at Kerala Forest Research Institute, Peechi, Thrissur in 1977. In 1979, she became a lecturer at Department of Library and Information Science, University of Kerala. From 1990 to 1995 she served as the Head of the Department.

She retired as associate professor from the department on 31 March 2006.

Bibliography
Lenin has been contributing poems, short-stories and articles to mainstream periodicals since 1971.

Poetry collections
 Karingili (1976)
 Karkidavaavu (1995)
 Namukku Praarthikkaam (2000)
 Kadal (poems for children) (2000)

Novel
 Minnu (novel for children)

Television programmes
 Lyrics for Mahabali, Thiruvananthapuram Doordarshan (1987).
 Script for a documentary on Library Movement in Kerala, produced for Thiruvananthapuram Doordarshan(1988).
 Stories for two television serials Oridathorikkal (1990) and Mookkuthiyum Manchadiyum (1998) in Thiruvananthapuram Doordarshan.
 Presentation of the Television Programme Aksharam (16 episodes) in Thiruvananthapuram Doordarshan (1999).
 Judge on Kairali TV's poetry based reality show Mampazham (2010)

General
 Puthiya Vaayana, a book on reading for women.

Translations
 Public Library Sevanam (2006) (Tr. of Public Library Service: IFLA/UNESCO Guidelines for Development, Munchen: K.G. Saur, 2001)
 Bhoodaivangal (Tr. of The Earth Gods) in the Malayalam translation of Works of Kahlil Gibran. Kottayam, DC Books, 2002

Academics
She has 12 papers in the discipline of Library and Information Science to her credit.

Awards
Lalitha Lenin's book, Minnu, was awarded the Kerala Sahitya Academy Award for children's literature in 1986. She is also a recipient of the Abudhabi Shakti Award for poetry in 1996 and the Moolur Award for poetry in 2001.

References

External links
 Official website of Lalitha Lenin
 Department of Library and Information Science, University of Kerala
 Issue of Muse India: The literary journal featuring Lalitha Lenin also

Living people
1946 births
Malayalam poets
Malayalam-language writers
Indian women novelists
People from Thrissur district
Academic staff of the University of Kerala
Scholars from Kerala
Indian women poets
Indian librarians
20th-century Indian chemists
Indian women chemists
Scientists from Kerala
Writers from Kerala
Women librarians
Indian women screenwriters
21st-century Indian women writers
21st-century Indian writers
20th-century Indian women writers
20th-century Indian writers
21st-century Indian women scientists
21st-century Indian scientists
20th-century Indian women scientists
Women writers from Kerala
Women scientists from Kerala
Recipients of the Kerala Sahitya Akademi Award